Raw Power is a 1973 album by The Stooges.

Raw Power may also refer to:
Raw Power, a 1999 album by Trey Gunn
Raw Power (band), an Italian hardcore band
Raw Power (TV series), a British heavy metal television show from the 1990s